David Benoit (born May 9, 1968) is an American former professional basketball player, in the small forward position.

During his career, he played eight years in the National Basketball Association (NBA), six as a member of the Utah Jazz.

Personal life
Benoit was born in Lafayette, Louisiana.  He played high school basketball at Lafayette High School (Louisiana) and also had his jersey retired there.  Benoit played in the NJCAA for Tyler Junior College, from 1986 to 1988. His last two years of college basketball were spent with the University of Alabama's Crimson Tide.
He is also cousins with ex UFC champion Daniel Cormier

Professional career

Utah Jazz
Benoit was not selected in the 1990 NBA draft, playing his first professional season in Spain. In the following year, he joined the Utah Jazz as a free agent, and would post interesting numbers during his five-season spell.

In 1993, Benoit participated in the NBA Slam Dunk Contest, where he finished fourth out of eight contestants. During the 1994–95 season, he achieved a career-best 10 points and five rebounds per game in 71 regular season contests, to which he added 12 and six in the postseason's first round, as the Jazz were downed 2–3 by the eventual champion Houston Rockets.

New Jersey/Orlando
After losing his starting position to Chris Morris, Benoit left the Jazz in the 1996 summer, and signed with the New Jersey Nets. He spent his first season in the sidelines, due to injury.

In early 1998, Benoit was traded, alongside Yinka Dare and Kevin Edwards, to the Orlando Magic, for Brian Evans and Rony Seikaly, appearing in 24 games and averaging six points. He left the United States to play with Maccabi Tel Aviv in Israel, due in part to the 1998 NBA lockout, and remained there for two years.

Jazz return
In 2000, Benoit returned to the team where he began his career. Now only a fringe player, he averaged 3.6 points in 49 games, as the Jazz once again qualified for the playoffs.

After leaving the NBA at the age of 33 (with averages of exactly seven points and four rebounds, in 492 games), Benoit played for the Shanghai Sharks alongside Yao Ming in the Chinese Basketball Association, winning the 2001–02 league championship. He spent four of the last five seasons of his career in the Japan Basketball League.

Head coaching record

|-
| style="text-align:left;"|Saitama Broncos
| style="text-align:left;"|2007–08
| 44||21||23|||| style="text-align:center;"|4th in Eastern|||-||-||-||
| style="text-align:center;"|-
|-
| style="text-align:left;"|Saitama Broncos
| style="text-align:left;"|2008–09
| 52||19||33|||| style="text-align:center;"|5th in Eastern|||-||-||-||
| style="text-align:center;"|-
|-
 
| style="text-align:left;"|Kyoto Hannaryz
| style="text-align:left;"|2009–10
| 42||15||27|||| style="text-align:center;"|Fired |||-||-||-||
| style="text-align:center;"|-
|-

References

External links
NBA.com profile
Stats at BasketballReference

1968 births
Living people
Alabama Crimson Tide men's basketball players
American expatriate basketball people in China
American expatriate basketball people in Israel
American expatriate basketball people in Japan
American men's basketball players
Basketball players from Louisiana
Kyoto Hannaryz coaches
Liga ACB players
Maccabi Tel Aviv B.C. players
New Jersey Nets players
Orlando Magic players
Saitama Broncos coaches
Saitama Broncos players
Shanghai Sharks players
Sportspeople from Lafayette, Louisiana
Small forwards
Sun Rockers Shibuya players
Tyler Apaches men's basketball players
Undrafted National Basketball Association players
Utah Jazz players